Matthew Fish (born 5 January 1989) is an English footballer.

Career
Fish progressed through the Crystal Palace youth ranks but was released in the summer of 2007 after a short loan spell at AFC Wimbledon. He made the switch to Isthmian League Division One side Dover Athletic in 2007 after a successful trial. He enjoyed a successful spell at Dover, winning two promotions in four seasons, and in the summer of 2011 made the move up to the Football League with Gillingham on a free transfer, linking up with former Dover manager Andy Hessenthaler. He made his professional debut on 9 August 2011, in the Football League Cup 1–0 defeat to Brighton & Hove Albion at the Falmer Stadium, coming on as a second-half substitute for Barry Fuller. On 21 November 2014 Fish joined League Two club Portsmouth on loan until 3 January 2015.

In January 2015 Fish left Gillingham and joined Ebbsfleet United of Conference South. 
On 4 October 2016, Fish was released by Ebbsfleet United of Conference South.

He moved on to Welling United on 6 October 2016.

Honours
Dover Athletic
Isthmian League Division One South (1): 2007–08
Isthmian League Premier Division (1): 2008–09

Gillingham
Football League Two (1): 2012-13

References

External links

1989 births
Living people
Footballers from Croydon
English footballers
Association football defenders
Crystal Palace F.C. players
AFC Wimbledon players
Dover Athletic F.C. players
Gillingham F.C. players
Portsmouth F.C. players
Ebbsfleet United F.C. players
Welling United F.C. players
English Football League players
National League (English football) players
Isthmian League players